Ski- og Fotballklubben Trygg was a sports club in Oslo, Norway, which played an important role for bandy in Norway and also was well-known for its ice hockey section.

History
The club was founded in 1907.

The ice hockey team was one of the founding members of the Hovedserien, the top level Norwegian league, for the 1934–35 season. They won the league championship in 1935 and then again in 1938. Their last appearance in the league came during the 1938–39 season.

The bandy section was one of the founding members of Norges Ishockeyforbund in 1920, later renamed  the Norway's Bandy Association and still the governing body for bandy in Norway. It won the Norwegian Bandy Premier League in 1921.

The club also consisted of a football department.

The club merged with Mercantile SFK in 1947.

References

Sport in Oslo
Defunct ice hockey teams in Norway
Defunct bandy clubs in Norway
Defunct football clubs in Norway
Football clubs in Oslo
Association football clubs established in 1907
Bandy clubs established in 1907
Ice hockey clubs established in 1907
1907 establishments in Norway
Sports clubs disestablished in 1947
1947 disestablishments in Norway